The Midland Reporter-Telegram is a daily newspaper in Midland, Texas. It is located in the heart of the vast 54-county Permian Basin of West Texas, a geological region which produces 70 percent of the oil in Texas. The newspaper's special coverage includes the "Permian Basin Oil Report", a weekly section devoted to news of the gas and oil industry, and Mywesttexasjobs.com, a weekly employment magazine that is free to the community and has a wide distribution throughout the Permian Basin.

The Reporter-Telegram is a Hearst Corporation publication, having been acquired by the corporation in 1979.

Staff 

In October 2015, Hearst named Jeffrey P. Shabram as Publisher of the Midland Reporter-Telegram and its West Texas companion publications, The Plainview Daily Herald in Plainview, The Canyon News in Canyon, and The Muleshoe Journal in Muleshoe, Texas. Prior to the appointment, Shabram was Vice President of Midland Newspapers and Senior Director of Digital for Berkshire Hathaway Media based in Omaha, Nebraska.

Mary Gilda Dearen (born 1955) is the managing editor. She is married to western novelist and historian Patrick Dearen.

References

External links 

 
 Official mobile website
 Hearst Corporation: Midland Reporter-Telegram

Daily newspapers published in Texas
Hearst Communications publications
Newspapers published in Midland–Odessa